Michael Andrew Leighton (20 October 1954 – 8 November 2014) was an Australian politician.

Born in Melbourne, Victoria, he attended Monash University 1972–76 and subsequently began practising as a psychiatric nurse. Having joined the Labor Party in 1976, he became a trade union official in 1981, and in 1980 became a City of Heidelberg councillor, serving until 1982. In 1988, he was elected to the Victorian Legislative Assembly as the Labor member for Preston. He held various positions in the shadow ministry from 1992–96, but was not included on the front bench when Labor won office in 1999. Leighton retired in 2006. He died, aged 60, on 8 November 2014.

References

1954 births
2014 deaths
Australian Labor Party members of the Parliament of Victoria
Members of the Victorian Legislative Assembly
Monash University alumni
Victoria (Australia) local councillors
21st-century Australian politicians
Politicians from Melbourne
Psychiatric nurses